Pittsburg/Bay Point station is a Bay Area Rapid Transit station in Pittsburg, California, United States, adjacent to the community of Bay Point. It serves northern and eastern Contra Costa County, as well as the Sacramento–San Joaquin River Delta.

History 

The station opened on December 7, 1996. Service was temporarily cut back to North Concord/Martinez station from March 16–21, 2016 (and at off-peak times until April 2) after electrical issues between the stations damaged a number of trains.

BART began further service on the eBART line between Pittsburg/Bay Point and Antioch station on May 26, 2018. Unlike the rest of the BART system, the eBART extension uses small self-propelled diesel multiple unit (DMU) railcars, thus requiring a passenger transfer between the two different trains. A second island platform (with one track for eBART and one for conventional BART trains) was constructed  to the east of Pittsburg/Bay Point station, providing a cross-platform transfer for passengers continuing past the station. The transfer platform does not have street access, so passengers must ride a mainline BART train connecting the two platforms.

A 2018 study recommended a footbridge to the north side of the tracks — either from the fare lobby or the parking lot — to improve access from nearby residential areas. A ramp to supplement the often-broken elevator from parking lot to fare lobby was also recommended. An entrance from Bailey Road at the east end of the platform was deemed infeasible.

References

External links 

BART – Pittsburg/Bay Point

1996 establishments in California
Bay Area Rapid Transit stations in Contra Costa County, California
Bay Point, California
Stations on the Yellow Line (BART)
Bus stations in Contra Costa County, California
Pittsburg, California
Railway stations in the United States opened in 1996
Transport infrastructure completed in 2018